The Bishop of Northampton is the Ordinary of the Roman Catholic Diocese of Northampton in the Province of Westminster, England.

The see is in the town of Northampton where the bishop's seat is located in the Cathedral Church of Our Lady and Saint Thomas of Canterbury.

The current bishop is the Right Reverend David Oakley, who was ordained bishop on 19 March 2020.

History
The Apostolic Vicariate of the Eastern District of England was created in 1840 out of the Midland District (which was renamed the Central District) and a couple of counties out of the London District. The Eastern District consisted of the counties of Cambridgeshire (with the Isle of Ely), Huntingdonshire, Lincolnshire, Norfolk, Northamptonshire, Rutland, and Suffolk, all from the former Midland District, and the counties of Bedfordshire and Buckinghamshire from the London District.

On the restoration of the Catholic hierarchy in England and Wales by Pope Pius IX in 1850, most of the Eastern District became the Diocese of Northampton, with the Vicar Apostolic the Eastern District, William Wareing, appointed the first bishop of the diocese. The remainder of the Eastern District (Lincolnshire and Rutland) became part of the Diocese of Nottingham. Through the Local Government Act of 1972, a small area of Buckinghamshire became part of Berkshire, and Huntingdonshire and the Isle of Ely merged into Cambridgeshire. The Diocese of Northampton lost territory (Cambridgeshire, Norfolk, and Suffolk) on the creation of the Diocese of East Anglia in 1976.

List of the bishops of Northampton and its precursor offices

Vicar Apostolic of the Eastern District

Bishops of Northampton

References

Bibliography

 

Northampton
Roman Catholic Diocese of Northampton